Hugh Heron (22 May 1890 – 6 December 1947) was an Australian rules footballer who played with Fitzroy and Essendon in the Victorian Football League (VFL).

Heron made his league debut for Fitzroy in the same match as his brother Percy, who was also recruited from the Fitzroy Juniors. After just one season, Heron switched clubs and joined Essendon but could only add a further two VFL appearances. He then turned to boundary umpiring and officiated in 120 matches from 1914 to 1926, one of them the 1923 Grand Final, where the field umpire was another former VFL player in Alec Mutch.

He died in a car accident on 6 December 1947.

References

Holmesby, Russell and Main, Jim (2007). The Encyclopedia of AFL Footballers. 7th ed. Melbourne: Bas Publishing.

1890 births
Australian rules footballers from Melbourne
Fitzroy Football Club players
Essendon Football Club players
Australian Football League umpires
Road incident deaths in Victoria (Australia)
1947 deaths
People from Clifton Hill, Victoria